Datuk Seri Panglima Md Salleh bin Md Said (Jawi: محمد صالح بن محمد سعيد; born 10 July 1958), commonly known as Salleh Said Keruak, is a Malaysian politician who was Chief Minister of the state of Sabah from 1994 to 1996. He was Speaker of the Sabah State Legislative Assembly from 2010 to 2015 and has served as Minister of Information and Communications of Malaysia since 29 July 2015 until 10 May 2018. He also serves as a Senator in the Dewan Negara; previously he was the state assemblyman for the electoral district of Usukan. He is the son of Mohammad Said Keruak, who served as Chief Minister as well as Yang di-Pertua Negeri of Sabah.

Riding on Barisan Nasional (BN) ticket to contest in the federal parliamentary seat of Kota Belud, he and two other candidates eventually lost the votes to Sabah Heritage Party (WARISAN) candidate as well his cousin Isnaraissah Munirah Majilis in the 2018 general election.

Educational background 
He was a Bachelor graduate from Simon Fraser University in Political Science and a Phd in Political Science and Government from Universiti Putra Malaysia .

Career 
After further studies, he was designated as Kota Belud District Officer.

He also held some positions in the Cabinet of Sabah. In many years, he was the Minister of State for Finance, Minister of State for Local Government and Housing and Deputy Chief Minister of State.

On 28 December 1994, Prime Minister Mahathir Mohamad appointed him as the Chief Minister of the State. His tenure as the State Chief Minister ended on 26 May 1996, and he was succeeded by Sabah Progressive Party (SAPP) President Yong Teck Lee.

On 4 January 2010, Chief Minister of State, Musa Aman, appointed him as his Science and Technology Adviser with ministerial rank. He replaced Tham Nyip Shen, former Deputy Chief Minister of State.

On 12 January 2011, he was appointed as the Speaker of the State Legislature. Before that, on the first day of 2011, he was appointed as the Chairman of National Film Development Corporation Malaysia (FINAS)  by the Federal Minister of Information, Communication and Culture, Dr. Rais Yatim.

Under the party of United Malays National Organisation (UMNO), he is the Sabah Liaison Deputy Chairman. He also presides over the United Sabah Bajau Organisation (USBO).

On 6 October 2019, he admitted that he is submitting the admission letter to the People’s Justice Party (PKR) as the party is multiracial, and it is in line with Salleh's political beliefs, especially focusing on the future of the Malaysian state in East Malaysia, Sabah.

On 30 June 2020, he canceled his application to join PKR after 2020 political crisis including PKR's internal turmoil. He was applying to rejoin UMNO back before the snap state election but the approval is pending. On 10 September 2020, Salleh rejoin UMNO.

Election results

Honours 
  :
  Commander of the Order of Kinabalu (PGDK) - Datuk (1990)
  Grand Commander of the Order of Kinabalu (SPDK) - Datuk Seri Panglima (1996)
  :
  Grand Commander of the Exalted Order of Malacca (DGSM) - Datuk Seri (1996)

Family 
He is married to Datin Seri Panglima Datuk Raya Erom on 18 December 1985 and has two sons and two daughters. The names of his children are, Mohd Syarulnizam (born 1987), Syazeera (born 1989), Mohd Hafeez (born 1997) and Syeera (born 2002). Salleh is also the second cousin of Isnaraissah Munirah Majilis.

References

External links 
 Personal blogsite

1958 births
Living people
People from Sabah
Bajau people
Malaysian Muslims
Malaysian bloggers
United Malays National Organisation politicians
United Sabah Party politicians
Chief Ministers of Sabah
Sabah state ministers
Speakers of the Sabah State Legislative Assembly
Members of the Sabah State Legislative Assembly
Government ministers of Malaysia
Members of the Dewan Rakyat
Members of the Dewan Negara
Grand Commanders of the Order of Kinabalu
Simon Fraser University alumni
21st-century Malaysian politicians